Wichita USD 259 is a public unified school district headquartered in Wichita, Kansas, United States.  The district includes most of the cities of Wichita, Bel Aire, Eastborough, and Kechi.

Overview
The largest school district in the state of Kansas, USD 259 had these approximate statistics in 2016:
 Students: 49,851 

 Teachers and staff:  about 9,000
 Budget: about $650 million
 Graduation rate: about 75%
 Schools:
 54 - Elementary schools
  3 - "K-8" schools (combined elementary/middle schools)
 15 - Middle schools
  9 - High schools
 12 - Special program sites

(Of these schools, 24 are specialized-curriculum "magnet" schools.)

The National Center for Educational Statistics (NCES) of the U.S. Department of Education, in 2006, reported that, in the fall of 2004, the Wichita Public Schools ranked 91st largest, by total enrollment, among all school districts in the nation. It also indicated that the Wichita Public Schools, in 2003–2004, had a total revenue of $452,437,000.

School board
The Wichita Public Schools (USD 259) are governed by a non-partisan elected school board, the USD 259 Board of Education (BoE), which has seven members. Six members are nominated by voters in six geographically defined board districts throughout the overall school district. There is one nominee from each district.  Those nominated then run for election district-wide. The seventh board member is nominated, and then elected,  from the school district at large. Elections are for four-year terms, and are held in odd-numbered years (winners taking office the following January). Members are elected with staggered terms. Three members are up for election in 2020; then, two years later, the remaining four members are elected.

Administration

Superintendent
The Wichita Public Schools chief executive is the Superintendent of Schools.

Alicia Thompson became Superintendent in July, 2017—the District's first woman, and first African-American, to hold that post. She was previously the district's assistant superintendent for elementary schools. Thompson is one of the district's few superintendents, in recent decades, to be promoted to that post from within the district; most have come from out-of-state. However, polling of the public, during the latest superintendent-hiring process, informed the Wichita BoE that the community strongly preferred a local person, from within the Wichita Public Schools system, for the post. Thompson, who attended Wichita Public Schools at all levels, from kindergarten though high school graduation, served in the district as an elementary school teacher, principal and administration executive, prior to appointment as assistant superintendent, then superintendent.

Thompson succeeded Superintendent John Allison (who announced his resignation, to become superintendent of the Olathe Public Schools in Olathe); Allison served as superintendent since 2009, succeeding Winston Brooks, who resigned in 2008.

In March 2023, the school board named Kelly Bielefeld to be the new superintendent starting on July 1st.

Schools
The school district operates the following schools:

High schools
 Wichita East High School
 Wichita Heights High School
 Wichita North High School
 Wichita Northeast Magnet High School
 Wichita Northwest High School
 Wichita South High School
 Wichita Southeast High School
 Wichita West High School
 Chester I. Lewis Academic Learning Center
 Wichita Alternative High School
 Sowers Alternative

Middle schools

Regular

Coleman Middle School
Curtis Middle School
Hadley Middle School
Hamilton Middle School
Marshall Middle School
Mead Middle School
Pleasant Valley Middle School
Robinson Middle School
Stucky Middle School
Truesdell Middle School
Wilbur Middle School

Magnet and special-purpose schools
Allison Traditional Magnet Middle School
Brooks Center for STEM and Arts Magnet Middle School
Jardine STEM and Career Explorations Academy
Mayberry Cultural and Fine Arts Magnet Middle School
Wells Alternative

Elementary schools

Regular

Adams Elementary School
Allen Elementary School
Anderson Elementary School
Beech Elementary School
Benton Elementary School
Caldwell Elementary School
Cessna Elementary School
Chisholm Trail Elementary School
Clark Elementary School
Cloud Elementary School
College Hill Elementary School
Colvin Elementary School
Enterprise Elementary School
Franklin Elementary School
Gammon Elementary School
Gardiner Elementary School
Griffith Elementary School
Harry Street Elementary School
Irving Elementary School
Jackson Elementary School
Jefferson Elementary School
Kensler Elementary School
Lawrence Elementary School
Linwood Elementary School
McCollom Elementary School
OK Elementrary School
Ortiz Elementrary School
Park Elementary School
Payne Elementary School
Peterson Elementary School
Pleasant Valley Elementary School
Seltzer Elementary School
Stanley Elementary School
Washington Elementary School
White Elementary School
Woodman Elementary School

Magnet and special-purpose schools
Black Traditional Magnet Elementary School
Bostic Traditional Magnet Elementary School
Bryant Opportunity Academy
Buckner Performing Arts and Science Magnet Elementary School
Cleaveland Traditional College and Career Readiness Magnet School
Dodge Literacy Magnet Elementary School
Earhart Environmental Magnet Elementary School
Enders Leadership and Community Service Magnet Elementary
Greiffenstein Alternative School
Hyde Leadership and International Explorations Magnet
Isely Traditional Magnet Elementary School
Kelly Liberal Arts Academy
L'Ouverture Career Exploration and Technology Magnet Elementary School
Levy Special Education Center
McLean Science and Technology Magnet
Minneha Core Knowledge Magnet Elementary School
Mueller Aerospace and Engineering Discovery Magnet Elementary School
Price-Harris Communications Magnet Elementary School
Riverside Leadership Magnet Elementary School
Spaght Science and Communications Magnet Elementary School
Woodland Health and Wellness Magnet

Kindergarten through 8th grade schools
Christa McAuliffe K-8 Academy
Gordon Parks Academy STEM Leaders in Applied and Media Arts
Horace Mann K-8 Dual Language Magnet School

Vocational/technical and continuing education schools
Beginning in 1931, and continuing until 2004, the Wichita Public Schools had vocational education programs, both in regular schools and in special vocational/technical and continuing-education schools. These programs primarily served secondary school students, but also served adults returning for further education and training.

In 1931 and 1952, vocational buildings were added onto the south side of Wichita High School East, and along adjacent Grove Street, to provide training in vocational and industrial arts. Between 1952 and 1968, about 600 students enrolled each year in various vocational courses there. In the summer of 1968, the district chose this site to open its Wichita Area Vocational-Technical School (WAVTS) "Vocational Technical Center" (by 1996, officially, the "Grove Campus" of the Wichita Area Technical College). This facility, under a separate administration, offered training in 18 different areas of trade and industry, to both students and adults.

In 1953, bowing to decades of pressure from West Wichitans, the district built the first high school in West Wichita - Wichita High School West, which, at its inception was primarily a vocational-technical school (initially, only 22% of West High graduates went on to college). Consequently, the West High curriculum initially emphasized vocational preparation, rather than academics. A large homemaking department taught students family budgeting, food preparation, child care and family relations. The school's business education department taught secretarial training, stenography, retail selling and business. An industrial education department taught woodworking, metalworking, auto mechanics, electrical work, printing, mechanical drawing and other trades. However, the school eventually became a regular academic high school, which it is today.

From 1965 to 2004, the Wichita Public Schools operated a system of vocational and continuing education which chiefly included:

 the School of Vocational Education (officially the Wichita Area Vocational-Technical School - WAVTS - on Grove Street, behind Wichita High School East)
 the School of Continuing Education (in the original Wichita High School building at Third and Emporia streets—by 1970, designated the "Central Vocational School," by 1984 the "Central Vocational Building" (CVB), and by 1996, the "WATC Central Campus")

By 1973, the Wichita Area Vocational Technical School had become the largest public school in Wichita, with over 5,000 people enrolling in its classes each year. WAVTS had expanded its vocational training from rudimentary crafts, to include advanced industrial skills such as estimating, procurement, production line setup and production scheduling. Concurrently, traditional home economics courses were still being taught at secondary schools throughout the system, but had been expanded to provide professional food service skills. Wichita's superintendent of schools, at the time, reportedly declared that they were "offering... an educational mix" divided "equally between" normal "academic training" courses and "advanced vocational schooling"—vocational training that was "geared" towards "real concepts and needs", to prepare students for "job hunting."

An additional WAVTS campus was established at the Wichita Municipal Airport to teach aircraft maintenance and provide training for occupations in Wichita's principal industry, aviation. However, difficulties between the aviation industry and WAVTS led to local industry leaders inviting Cowley County Community College to establish a substitute facility at the former Cessna Aircraft Field in southeast Wichita.>

In 1987, the Wichita Area Vocational Technical School partnered with Butler County Community College to develop an Associate of Applied Science degree in electronic engineering technology. A technical school could not offer an associate degree, so the partnering with Butler was necessary.  At the request of Wichita community business leaders in late 1990, Wichita State University and the technical school partnered to offer this degree through WSU, and the agreement and degree were approved by the Kansas Board of Regents in 1991

In 1999, the name of WAVTS changed to Wichita Area Technical College (WATC),  and the college gained authority to grant college credit, and was empowered to award Associate of Applied Science (AAS) degrees.

In 2004, however, following strained relations between local industry and WATC, the Wichita Public Schools (USD 259) Board of Education transitioned WATC out of USD 259, and WATC became an independent public college, governed by its own board, the Sedgwick County Technical Education and Training Authority.

Following the district's 2004 divestiture of WAVTS (as WATC), Cowley's aviation training facility was acquired by WATC, then replaced by WATC, in 2010, with the National Center for Aviation Training (NCAT) at Wichita's Jabara Airport.

In 2001, an addition was made to the Levy Special Education Center, which included a vocational training center for the developmentally disabled.

Notable alumni

Several figures of national prominence in their field are alumni of the Wichita Public Schools, including former U.S. Agriculture Secretary and Kansas 4th District Congressman Dan Glickman (later Director of Harvard's Kennedy School of Government and Motion Picture Association of America president), actress Kirstie Alley, and actor Don Johnson.

Various Olympic medalists began their athletic careers in the Wichita Public Schools, including basketball star Lynette Woodard, track star Jim Ryun, swimmer Jeff Farrell, and boxer Nico Hernandez.

Among those who publicly credit their Wichita public school education for some of their success are former CIA director and U.S. Defense Secretary (under Presidents G.W. Bush & B. Obama) Robert Gates, Broadway theater and Metropolitan Opera star Karla Burns, and Heisman Trophy winner and member of the Pro Football Hall of Fame Barry Sanders.

See also
 Kansas State Department of Education
 Kansas State High School Activities Association
 List of high schools in Kansas
 List of unified school districts in Kansas

References

Further reading
 Our Common School Heritage : A History of the Wichita Public Schools; Sondra Van Meter; 466 pages; 1977; LCCN 77-90506. (abstract) (download)
 Wichita : Illustrated History 1868 to 1880; Eunice S. Chapter; 52 pages; 1914. (download)
 History of Wichita and Sedgwick County Kansas : Past and present, including an account of the cities, towns, and villages of the county; 2 Volumes; O.H. Bentley; C.F. Cooper & Co; 454 / 479 pages; 1910. (Volume1 download),(Volume2 download)

External links 
District
 
Historical
 Excerpts from A History of Wichita Public School Buildings, USD 259
News
 Wichita school district a pioneer in FEMA-approved storm shelter safe rooms, The Wichita Eagle
Maps    
 Wichita School District - High School Boundary Map, valid starting fall 2012, USD 259
 Wichita School District - Middle School Boundary Map, valid starting fall 2012, USD 259
 Wichita School District - Elementary School Boundary Map, valid starting fall 2012, USD 259
 Wichita School District - Boundary Map and Directory of Buildings, USD 259  
 USD 259 School District Boundary Map, KDOT

School districts in Kansas
Education in Wichita, Kansas
Education in Sedgwick County, Kansas